"Beautiful Doom" is the fifth episode of the ninth season of the American television medical drama Grey's Anatomy, and the show's 177th episode overall. Written by Jeannine Renshaw and directed by Stephen Cragg, the episode was originally broadcast on the American Broadcasting Company (ABC) in the United States on November 8, 2012. The initial airing was viewed by 9.26 million people and garnered a 3.3/8 Nielsen rating in the 18–49 demographic, registering the show as the week's highest rated television drama. Grey's Anatomy centers around a group of physicians struggling to balance their professional lives with their personal lives.

In the episode Meredith Grey (Ellen Pompeo) relives the memories of her half-sister Lexie Grey (Chyler Leigh) who died in the season eight finale plane crash when a patient with similar crush injuries comes into the hospital. The episode also focuses on Cristina Yang (Sandra Oh) who deals with the death of her Minnesota mentor Dr. Craig Thomas (William Daniels) in the middle of surgery. Meredith in spite of opposition from Richard Webber (James Pickens Jr.) tries to treat the crash victim while dealing with her personal feelings relating Lexie. She also juggles her daughter Zola at the hospital with the absence of her husband, Derek Shepherd (Patrick Dempsey), with Owen Hunt (Kevin McKidd), Callie Torres (Sara Ramirez) and Miranda Bailey (Chandra Wilson) helping her.

Plot
Meredith is forced to juggle parenting with work when Derek has a lecture in Boston. Cristina is on the phone with Meredith again, bragging to her about the aneurysm. Meredith is in her car, and she passes an accident. It looks bad, so she parks her car and gets out to help. The driver is fine, but when Meredith runs to the other side of the car, she sees woman trapped under the car. This reminds her of Lexie, who was trapped under a part of the crashed plane. Meredith and Cristina lean on each other and maintain their long-distance friendship. The two friends continue to cope with life after the plane crash and their ever-growing responsibilities at their respective hospitals.

Cristina and Dr. Thomas are explaining to a patient with the aneurysm that she needs to have two surgeries: one to repair the current aneurysm, and another surgery to fix the defect that formed the aneurysm. The patient and her husband turn out to be doomsday preppers, ready for the apocalypse. Cristina and Dr. Thomas leave the room when they've finished their story.

Meredith is adamant about saving the life of her patient, Melissa, and while operating there's a lot of bleeding when Callie enters the OR. Callie looks at the scan of Melissa's break and she says there must be a lot of bleeding. Richard comes into the OR to tell Meredith that Melissa's parents have been found and that they're coming to the hospital. Meredith asks for more blood transfusion, but Richard and Callie think that it might be time to pack up Melissa and let her body rest. She keeps operating a little longer, until Richard calls her name. She then agrees to pack up the patient. He is worried that the case is hitting a little too close to home for her after what happened to Lexie. He's worried that her emotions are clouding her judgement, but she tells him that that's not the case. She leaves to go check on Melissa.

Meredith and Cristina are on the phone, Meredith is leaving the hospital, and Cristina is in a liquor store. Cristina says that she fears that the patient will die, and that Dr. Thomas will be fired. Meredith is worried about her patient too, as she needs to go home with Zola because Derek is out of town. Cristina is on the phone with Meredith again, telling her that Dr. Thomas will do the surgery. She says that he'll get fired if he does it. Meredith says that she needs to find the perfect window to open her patient back up.

Meredith is writing her surgery on the O.R. board, as it's the perfect window to go in. Richard stands next to her, and Meredith assures him that it's nothing like in the woods, as they're in a hospital with a lot of medical resources. He wishes her good luck, and says that it's a right call to go back in. Ultimately Meredith has found the source of the bleeding and clamps it. She then makes time for a 30-second dance party, and makes everyone, including Bokhee, dance with her.  Meredith comes into the attendings lounge, but Zola isn't there. She runs down a hallway, and then she sees Owen carrying Zola. He explains that he took her as April had a surgery and that Zola's fever is down.

Cristina assists Dr. Thomas with a cardiac case, when he suddenly suffers a heart attack during the operation, he collapses. This forces Cristina to keep operating on her own. Meanwhile, several nurses get to Dr. Thomas and try to revive him. Dr. Parker comes in, and starts CPR. Cristina has her back turned towards them, so she asks what's going on. Dr. Parker tells her to focus on her patient. Cristina informs the patient's family that the patient is okay. The patient's husband hugs her.

Melissa is asking for Meredith. She leaves Zola with Owen, as he doesn't have to go anywhere, and she runs off. Melissa meets Meredith, saying she remembers how Meredith was there when she was trapped. Meredith just put down Zola for the night when someone rings the doorbell. She opens the door and sees Cristina. They hug and Cristina says that she drank all the tequila that she bought earlier. "Lexie is dead," Meredith says. "Yeah... Everyone's dead," Cristina says, and they hug again.

Production

"Beautiful Doom" was written by Jeannine Renshaw and directed by Stephen Cragg. The episode features many cross-overs between Seattle (with Meredith at Seattle Grace) and Minnesota (where Cristina was practicing at Mayo Clinic). The cross-overs were depicted via split-screen sequences which later on release garnered positive reviews.

TVLine in April reported that Emmy winner William Daniels will guest star on an episode of Grey's Anatomy at the end of season 8, playing a proctor for Cristina Yang during her medical boards. This marked the first acting role for Daniels since playing a judge on a 2008 episode of Boston Legal. Daniels has had several iconic roles before that, including Dr. Mark Craig on St. Elsewhere for which he won two Emmy Award in the 1980s. He was known to the younger fans as the wise teacher and neighbor Mr. Feeny on Boy Meets World. He made his debut in the final episodes of the eight season, Daniels played one of the doctors overseeing the medical boards being taken by the Seattle Grace residents. “it’s actually really hilarious!” Sandra Oh told TVLine of the episode, which was directed by her scene partner Kevin McKidd. “I just shot the entire boards episode with the wonderful William Daniels, who played Cristina’s proctor. It was phenomenal to be working opposite him.” In Beautiful Doom Daniels made his last appearance as Dr. Thomas as he, after being persecuted by his boss into early retirement, suffered a heart attack while performing a surgery and dies in the OR right next to Cristina while she's forced to continue working on the patient, unable to save him.

Reception

Broadcast
"Beautiful Doom" was originally broadcast on Thursday, September 27, 2012 in the United States on ABC. On its initial airing the episode was watched by 9.26 million viewers and ranked 20th in the overall viewership and was among the top 10 in the 18-49 key demographic placed at no. 9. The episode scored a 3.3/8 in the Nielsen Ratings and was also ranked as the no. 1 most watched drama. The episode had an increase in viewership from the previous installment which was watched by 8.76 million viewers and was also up in the viewership ranks.

Critical reception

The episode was well received among television critics, the major praise was directed towards Ellen Pompeo and Sandra Oh. Wetpaint wrote, "Beautiful Doom was all about our favorite friendship. That's right, it was the Meredith Grey (Pompeo) and Cristina Yang (Oh) show, and it was nice to spend some quality time with the twisted sisters. Overall, we enjoyed the episode. The split screen was used well, and we loved seeing Cristina and Mer talk to each other about their lives. Dr. Thomas continued to be a delight, and his death really struck home."

TVLine gave the episode a positive review as well stating, "After months of hype, Grey’s Anatomy at long last pulled the curtain back on its big Mer/Cristina-centric episode Thursday night. The memorable hour divided its time between Seattle Grace, where Mer was tending to a super-critical patient, and the Mayo Clinic, where Cristina was also tending to a super-critical patient. Before the end credits rolled, there was a pivotal death, a long-awaited comeback, and more split-screen action than an episode of 24." TwoCents also gave a positive review to the episode mainly for directing the praise to Oh and Pompeo as well saying, "After the first episodes of the seasons stuffed to the gills with new interns, new doctors, all cast members, and new locales, I found this hour to be refreshing in its simplicity and directness. Because regardless of the distance, I don’t know that they’ve ever been closer or more mature with one another. And Cristina Yang is finally home where she belongs. Meredith and Cristina are each other’s person, and tonight they were our people and focus.  right now I’m just so happy to see our twisted sisters reunited in person, that I can’t find much else to complain about!" The site also praised Sara Ramirez and Chandra Wilson adding, "Callie and Bailey fantastic in their limited appearances, reminding Meredith that they are both working mothers, trying to find the home-work balance."

Entertainment Weekly called it a "wrenching episode" adding, "It was undoubtedly by exactly perfect design, but Cristina uttered the most poignant line of Grey’s Anatomy’s ninth season so far in the last few seconds of last night’s episode – a line that sums up everything that’s happened so far: "Everyone’s dead," she said to Meredith without much fanfare, as the two best friends – separated by half a country for five episodes – embraced for the first time this fall." Writing about the death of Dr. Craig Thomas the site wrote, "Grey’s decided to pull his plug much more dramatically, with him literally keeling over mid-surgery. Also thankfully, considering everything, Yang was successful in her surgery. If it hadn’t gone well, it might have sent me over the edge to have Feeny and the patient die minutes from each other." The site also praised the closing scene of the episode, "I guess the moment – a good one, with Cristina liquored up on tequila – was a good one regardless, just seeing these good, old friends cross paths once again, as they should."

E! Online praised the Pompeo and Oh's characters saying, "Tonight's episode was all about Meredith and Cristina. Even half a country apart, these two are still each other's people. A lot of the episode featured a split screen between Meredith in Seattle and Cristina in Minnesota, while each leaned on each other to get through some emotional times." Wrirtng about Dr. Thomas' death the site added, "If he's going down, he wants to go down fighting. Unfortunately during surgery, Thomas goes down…literally. Why does Shonda Rhimes do this to us?! Maybe because this is what sends Cristina back to Seattle." SpoilerTV praised Pompeo, saying, The ensemble format of Grey's Anatomy works well for me. I love the inter-twining of the characters and the ongoing multiple stories. It's a hospital and hospitals bustle with constant activity so a large cast works well. But Meredith centered episodes always work too not just because she is the original key protagonist in the show but because her character has been so well developed over the show's long life. This episode was no exception. I thoroughly enjoyed Golden Hour in season 7 and Ellen Pompeo does an equally good job here sharing the screen, literally and metaphorically with Sandra Oh."

References

2012 American television episodes
Grey's Anatomy (season 9) episodes